Moy railway station served in the village of Moy, Highland, Scotland from 1897 to 1965 on the Inverness and Aviemore Direct Railway.

History 
The station on 19 July 1897 by the Inverness and Aviemore Direct Railway. The station building was situated on the southbound platform. Goods facilities were handled at the northeast. There were two signal boxes: north and east. Despite their names, they were both situated to the west. The station closed to both passengers and goods traffic on 3 May 1965.

References

External links 

Disused railway stations in Highland (council area)
Railway stations in Great Britain opened in 1897
Railway stations in Great Britain closed in 1965
Beeching closures in Scotland
1897 establishments in Scotland
1965 disestablishments in Scotland
Former Highland Railway stations